Fosterella rusbyi is a plant species in the genus Fosterella. This species is native to Bolivia and Peru.

References

rusbyi
Flora of Bolivia
Flora of Peru
Plants described in 1902